Auburn University's College of Architecture, Design and Construction (CADC) is one of fourteen colleges and schools that comprise Auburn University, a land, sea and space grant institution located in Auburn, Alabama. The CADC offers
undergraduate programs in architecture, interior architecture, landscape architecture, building construction, environmental design, graphic design, and industrial design. The College also offers graduate programs in building construction, landscape architecture, industrial design, executive real estate development (a joint program with AU's Harbert College of Business), and distance education in construction management.

History
The architecture program in Auburn University began as part of the civil engineering curriculum in 1907, making Auburn one of the first universities in the nation, and the first in the South, to offer architecture as a major. Five years later, a department was established when Joseph Hudnut was appointed chair. In 1927, when Frederic Child Biggin was chosen to head the department, it acquired the status of the School of Architecture and Applied Arts. That same year, Interior Design was one of the allied programs created in the school.

The early 1930s saw a number of firsts in what would become departments in the CADC.
Landscape Architecture and Regional Planning (later to become Community Planning) programs were established in 1930.
In 1932, as part of the five-year Bachelor of Science degree in Architecture at Auburn, a choice of an "Architectural Construction Option" was first offered.
In 1945, Auburn joined the Association of Collegiate Schools of Architecture, a membership association founded in 1912 to advance the quality of architectural education.

Over the past century, with new programs added to the school, it went through several name changes.
In 1950, when the school was reorganized, it was renamed the School of Architecture and Fine Arts, and took residence in Biggin Hall.
In 1977, the School moved into the newly built Dudley Hall, named after Auburn School of Engineering graduate and benefactor, Ralph Dudley (1884–1969).
In 1987, the School was renamed "The School of Architecture," and organized into three disciplines—Architecture, Building Science and Industrial Design.
In 1996, the College of Architecture, Design, and Construction (CADC) was born.
In consultation with Interior Design alumni, Interior Architecture was designed and launched in 1997.
In Fall 2007, when the Graphic Design Program was incorporated into the Department of Industrial Design, it became the Department of Industrial and Graphic Design.
Subsequently, in 2013, the department was renamed School of Industrial and Graphic Design.
In Fall 2020, the McWhorter School of Building Science established a Ph.D. in building construction.
In Fall 2021, the School of Architecture, Planning and Landscape Architecture re-established an undergraduate program in Landscape Architecture.

Dudley Hall, constructed in 1977, is the main building for the CADC. Dudley house the School of Architecture, Planning and Landscape Architecture and offices and studio spaces for faculty and students, seminar rooms, workshops, audiovisual center, computer facilities, project room, and the library. In addition to Dudley Hall, the CADC complex consists of the M. Miller Gorrie Center for the McWhorter School of Building Science, and Wallace Hall for the School of Industrial and Graphic Design.

Schools and programs

School of Architecture, Planning and Landscape Architecture
School of Architecture, Planning and Landscape Architecture (APLA) was created in 2011, when four allied degree programs—Architecture/Interior Architecture, Landscape Architecture, Integrated Design and Construction were brought together under one head. The coalition of programs within APLA (and with the CADC) exemplifies interdisciplinary collaboration as a model of professional activity; ensures that students have an overview of the various components in the design and building process; and promotes the connection among planning, landscape architecture, interior architecture, and architecture as interdependent practices. Further, APLA provides the students a context for understanding how these four elements of the building process integrate into the larger wholes of the community and urban context, and the planning, design, and construction industry. The relationship between the programs in the college also allows for joint degree programs that extend professional opportunities.

Architecture
The Architecture Program is a five-year program, that leads to an accredited professional Bachelor of Architecture degree. The professional Bachelor of Architecture (B. Arch.) is a fully accredited program by the National Architectural Accrediting Board (NAAB). The five-year curriculum is structured as two stages of study: Pre-Architecture and Professional studies. Service learning opportunities form an important component in the curriculum. After graduating with this degree and successfully completing a six-month internship, graduates are eligible to begin taking the ARE licensing exams.

Auburn University's College of Architecture, Design and Construction (CADC) programs once again are ranked among the best in the nation by DesignIntelligence in its annual survey, "America’s Best Architecture and Design Schools 2016." The architecture program is ranked eighth. These rankings are based on annual surveys of leading practitioners in these fields.

Interior architecture
Auburn's Interior Design program was established in 1927. Seventy years later, in 1997, Interior Design became a dual-degree program with Architecture, entitled Interior Architecture (ARIA). Interior Architecture students complete the first two years of the Architecture curriculum before entering the ARIA Program.
Starting in 1998, ARIA presented its first Summer Thesis class. Since then, the ARIA theses have dealt with Interior Architecture issues in relation to a social and international dimension.  Designs have included projects on Sarajevo, Havana, Turkey, Venice, Turkmenistan, Afghanistan, Sustainability projects at Auburn University.

Landscape architecture
Auburn's first Bachelor of Landscape Architecture (LA) was awarded in 1933, when LA was a part of the Department of Horticulture and Forestry.  In 1941, as a five-year program, LA was housed under the School of Architecture and Allied Arts.  But low enrollment forced the school to phase out the program in 1952. After a licensure legislation was passed in Alabama in 1976, the program was reestablished as a degree within the School of Architecture. The student chapter of the ASLA (American Society for Landscape Architecture) was formed in 1979. By 1993, the program had four full-time faculty, 50 students, and received a five-year accreditation renewal.  Jack Williams was appointed chair of the program in 1995. The program began to offer master's degree in 1998. Two years later, the first MLA students graduated, and the program was granted initial accreditation as a professional program.

Special programs

Rural studio
In 1993, Auburn University architecture professors, Dennis K. Ruth and Samuel Mockbee, established the Auburn University Rural Studio in the university's School of Architecture. The Rural Studio which was designed as a method to improve the living conditions in rural Alabama and to include hands-on experience for architecture students, began designing and building homes that same fall semester.

Urban studio
Auburn University's Center for Architecture and Urban Studies—the Urban Studio—is a teaching and outreach program of Auburn's College of Architecture, Design and Construction. Students engage in the "laboratory" of downtown Birmingham. Their study/work includes professional seminars and studio design projects that emphasize community development and urban planning. The Studio's teaching program is designed to take advantage of the special opportunities characteristic in studying in an urban setting. Studio projects include "illustrative neighborhood and town master plans as well as designs for public-use buildings in locations with potential for significant urban impact."

McWhorter School of Building Science
As part of a five-year Bachelor of Science degree in Architecture at Auburn, the university first offered a choice of architectural construction option in 1932. This offering was followed by a course entitled "Light Construction" by the Civil Engineering Department in 1942. In 1945, a four-year degree entitled, "Building Construction," was developed and transferred to the Department of Architecture. The Building Science program at Auburn University (BSCI) established in 1947, is the second oldest construction education program in the United States. Building Construction Program attained departmental status in 1957 and was renamed the Department of Building Technology. In 1975, Building Technology became the Department of Building Science (BSCI), and moved into the newly built Dudley Hall in 1977, from Toomer's Corner. It received full accreditation in 1980.

With approval from the Alabama Council for Higher Education grants, a Master's of Building Construction was initiated in 1991. In 2006, the Department of Building Science moved to its new building M. Miller Gorrie Center (named after Miller Gorrie, a 1957 graduate of the Building Construction, and CEO of Birmingham-based Brasfield & Gorrie). The Center earned the State of Alabama's first LEED (Leadership in Energy and Environmental Design) gold certification. In 2007, the Department of Building Science undergoes yet another name change: the McWhorter School of Building Science.

In 2002, architecture professor D.K. Ruth collaborated with building science professor John Mouton to create the Design-Build Master program, one of only six in the country. The program is the only jointly-housed degree granting program between architecture and construction management in the United States. In 2012, the program was renamed Master of Integrated Design and Construction.  It was conceived as a way to prepare students for their professional lives.  Over the course of three semesters, students gain hands-on experience across the entire spectrum of estimating, scheduling, designing, and constructing projects identified through the College's Center for Community Outreach. At least 50% of the program's curriculum is taught by practicing professionals.

In 1946, enrollment in the new Bachelor of Building Construction degree program was 30 students, and quickly rose to 131 students a year later.  By 1968, there were seven faculty members and 160 students in the department.  The school is currently made up of 18 full-time faculty members, approximately 350 undergraduate students, and 20 graduate students.  The program has more than 3,000 graduates located worldwide, including many who are leaders of the construction industry in the Southeast United States. BSCI maintains a proud tradition of practical and professional construction education, offering both Bachelor's and master's degrees in Building Construction. It is a leader in exploring Information Technology applications in construction and construction education.  BSCI is an active member of the Associated Schools of Construction.

Master of Building Construction
The custom-Master of Building Construction for the U.S. Army Corps of Engineers is established.

Center for Construction Innovation and Collaboration (CCIC)
Created in 2011.

School of Industrial and Graphic Design
Industrial Design at Auburn University was established in the Department of Art in 1945, making it one of the oldest programs in the country. Jack Crist is appointed Program Chair of the Industrial Design Department in 1949. After first starting in Langdon Hall, the department moved from temporary trailers to the lower level of Biggin Hall in 1952.  In 1960, Ulm School graduates Drs. Eva Pfeil and Walter Schaer join the faculty.

In 1977, Industrial Design gained separate departmental status within the School of Architecture and Fine Arts. With the organization of the new School of Architecture into three departments in 1987, Industrial Design became a part of it. The College of Architecture, Design, and Construction (CADC) was born in 1996, and assumed the Department of Industrial Design under its wing. Succeeding William Bullock, FIDSA, Clark Lundell was appointed head of the Department of Industrial Design and firmly established its highly regarded industry-collaborations program, started in the 60s with ARMCO Steel and ALCOA, continuing in the 70s and 80s with NASA. In 2000, the department moves from its home of 23 years, O.D. Smith Hall, to the newly renovated Wallace Center. Industrial Design Department was awarded accreditation of its graduate and undergraduate curricula by the NASAD (National Association of Schools of Art and Design). In Fall 2007, the Graphic Design Program was incorporated into the Department of Industrial Design. The School of Industrial and Graphic Design was now part of the College of Architecture, Design and Construction. In 2007, the department grew to around 200 undergraduates, 20 graduates and 10 post baccalaureate students.  In 2013, the department of Industrial and Graphic Design was named the School of Industrial and Graphic design. The school has been consistently ranked in the top ten programs in the country by DesignIntelligence.

Graphic design
Graphic Design is an eight-semester program.

Industrial Design Studies
The School of Industrial + Graphic Design offers the Post-Baccalaureate, Bachelor of Science Degree in Industrial Design to students who would like to pursue a Master of Industrial Design but do not have a design background. Students complete forty-three credit hours of undergraduate study in industrial design.

College programs

Master of Real Estate Development (MRED)

In 2011, the Executive Master of Real Estate Development was founded in collaboration with Auburn's Raymond J. Harbert College of Business. The program was created to provide continuing education to established professionals with 5+ years of experience in real estate. MRED is a partnership between the College of Architecture, Design and Construction and the Harbert College of Business.

Student enrollment

As of Spring 2022, there are 1,617 students enrolled in the College: 498 (31%) in the School of Architecture, Planning and Landscape Architecture, 607 (37%) in the McWhorter School of Building Science, and 348 (22%) in the School of Industrial and Graphic Design. There are 164 (10%) graduate students in Building Construction, Industrial Design, Landscape Architecture, and Real Estate Development.

Academic rankings
The College has been consistently ranked among the best architecture schools in the country. DesignIntelligence has ranked the following programs among the most admired in the United States:

Architecture undergraduate program is ranked 13th (2018)
Landscape Architecture is ranked 20th (2018)

According to DesignIntelligence’s report, hiring firms rank Auburn's architecture program against other American architecture schools in each of these skill areas:
healthy build environments (7th)
interdisciplinary studies (7th)
transdisciplinary collaboration across architecture, engineering, and construction (9th)
project planning and management (8th)
practice management (8th)
sustainable built environments/adaptive design/resilient design (6th)
construction methods and materials (4th)

Faculty
CADC has 71 full-time faculty members and 16 visiting and part-time faculty members (2018). As of 2016, the CADC had over 11,000 alums, of which more than 4,000 are from Alabama. Many of the faculty members at CADC are practicing professionals and researchers.  A majority of them are members of

The American Institute of Architects (AIA)
American Institute of Certified Planners (AICP)
American Institute of Graphic Arts (AIGA)
American Society of Civil Engineers (ASCE)
Associated Schools of Construction (ASC)
Institute of Electrical and Electronics Engineers (IEEE)
Royal Institution of Chartered Surveyors, London, England
The Southeastern College Art Conference (SECAC)
Fellow of the American Institute of Architects (FAIA)
Fellow of the American Society of Landscape Architects (FASLA)
Council of Educators in Landscape Architecture (CELA)

Deans
 Frederic Child Biggin, 1927-43
 Turpin C. Bannister, 1944-48
 Frank M. Orr, 1949-56
 Samuel T, Hurst, 1957-61
 William A. Speer, 1962–67
 J. Ingram Clark, 1967–69
 Keith McPheeters, 1969-88
 Ray K. Parker, 1988–93
 J. Thomas Regan, 1994-99
 Daniel Bennett, 2000-10
 Vini Nathan, 2011-2022 (paused) 
 Karen Rogers (acting), 2022–

Notable alumni
 Marlon Blackwell, 1980; Marlon Blackwell Architects
 Tom Hardy, 1970; IBM Product Designer, Corporate Manager of IBM Design Program from 1970–92
 Paul Rudolph, 1940; Chairman of the School of Architecture at Yale University from 1957–65

References

Auburn University